Events from the year 1963 in Scotland.

Incumbents 

 Secretary of State for Scotland and Keeper of the Great Seal – Michael Noble

Law officers 
 Lord Advocate – Ian Shearer, Lord Avonside
 Solicitor General for Scotland – David Colville Anderson

Judiciary 
 Lord President of the Court of Session and Lord Justice General – Lord Clyde
 Lord Justice Clerk – Lord Grant
 Chairman of the Scottish Land Court – Lord Gibson

Events 
 1 January – Forth and Clyde Canal officially closed to navigation.
 2 May – Rootes car factory opens at Linwood, Renfrewshire to produce the Hillman Imp
 3 July – northbound Clyde Tunnel opened to traffic in Glasgow
 31 July – Peerage Act grants Peers of Scotland the same right to sit in the House of Lords as Peers of England, Great Britain and the United Kingdom, ending the election of representative peers; it will also permit Alec Douglas-Home to disclaim his title as 14th Earl of Home later this year
 15 August – Henry John Burnett is hanged for murder in Aberdeen, the last execution carried out in Scotland
 7 November – Kinross and Western Perthshire by-election: Conservatives retain the seat allowing Prime Minister Alec Douglas-Home to enter the House of Commons
 21 November – Dundee West by-election: Labour retains the seat
 12 December – Dumfriesshire by-election: Conservatives retain the seat
 Construction of the pioneering Solidac minicomputer is completed at Barr and Stroud for the University of Glasgow, the first computer built in Scotland
 First road access (a forest track) to the railway community at Riccarton Junction.

Births 
 3 January – Stewart Hosie, SNP politician
 13 April – Mo Johnston, international footballer
 25 April – David Moyes, footballer and manager
 27 April – Brendan O'Hara, SNP politician
 7 June – Ailsa McKay, economist and academic (died 2014)
 23 June – Colin Montgomerie, golfer
 6 September – Pat Nevin, international footballer
 21 September – Angus Macfadyen, actor
 4 November – Lena Zavaroni, entertainer (died 1999)
 24 November – Neale Cooper, footballer and manager (died 2018)
 28 November – Armando Iannucci, satirist
 30 November – Alex Rowley, Labour Party politician
 8 December – Brian McClair, international footballer and coach
 22 December – Bryan Gunn, international footballer and coach
 Anya Gallaccio, installation artist
 Don Paterson, poet, writer and jazz musician

Deaths 
 3 March – James Stevenson, Unionist Party (Scotland) MP (born 1883)
 22 July – Donald Campbell, Roman Catholic Archbishop of Glasgow (born 1894)
 16 August – Joan Eardley, landscape painter (born 1921)
 9 September – Duncan Walker, footballer (born 1899)
 22 November – Mary Findlater, novelist (born 1865)

The arts
 2 January – Traverse Theatre opens in Edinburgh
 3 January – The Beatles open their first tour of 1963 with a performance in Elgin
 English painter Norman Adams acquires a summer home on Scarp

See also 
 1963 in Northern Ireland

References 

 
Scotland
Years of the 20th century in Scotland
1960s in Scotland